The Audie Award for Science Fiction is one of the Audie Awards presented annually by the Audio Publishers Association (APA). It awards excellence in narration, production, and content for a science-fiction audiobook released in a given year. It has been awarded since 2003.

Winners and finalists

2000s

2010s

2020s

References

External links 

 Audie Award winners
 Audie Awards official website

Science Fiction
Science fiction awards
English-language literary awards
Awards established in 2003